{{DISPLAYTITLE:C11H14N2}}
The molecular formula C11H14N2 (molar mass : 174.24 g/mol, exact mass : 174.115698) may refer to :

 6-(2-Aminopropyl)indole
 Gramine
 5-IT
 α-Methyltryptamine
 N-Methyltryptamine